The freshwater mullet (Pseudomyxus capensis) is a species of fish in the family Mugilidae. It is endemic to South Africa.

Distribution
The freshwater mullet is endemic to South Africa where is distribution extends from Kwazulu-Natal, the Eastern Cape to the Western Cape, from Kosi Bay to the Breede River drainage.

Habitat and biology
This species is found in estuaries and the juveniles need freshwater reaches for growth and safety. The adults spawn at sea, after reaching sexual maturity in estuaries. The juveniles move into the estuaries and up into rivers in the late southern winter or early spring and then stay there for seven years for females and four years for males. They feed on benthic algae and small invertebrates over muddy substrates.

Conservation
The freshwater mullet's range and population have been impacted by the damming of streams and the introduction of alien fish.

Taxonomy
The freshwater mullet was previously assigned to Myxus, but genetic studies in 2012 found it to be more closely related to the Fringelip mullet than to the Sand grey mullet, necessitating the erection of the monospecific genus Pseudomyxus for this species.

References

Myxus
Freshwater fish of South Africa
Fish described in 1836
Taxonomy articles created by Polbot
Taxobox binomials not recognized by IUCN